The South Yorkshireman is a British named passenger train.

1940s, 1950s
The South Yorkshireman was started by British Railways in May 1948. It left  daily at 10:00, returning from London at 16:50, and calling at Huddersfield, Sheffield, and Leicester; in some years at least, also at Halifax, Brighouse, Penistone, Nottingham, Rugby and Aylesbury. It was not a particularly fast service even by the standards of that era, the down train taking 5 hours 30 minutes to get from London to Bradford. It usually had nine coaches including a restaurant car, and was often hauled by a Gresley A3 Pacific. The train continued running until 1960, when all long-distance expresses on the former Great Central route were withdrawn.

Present day
The South Yorkshireman in its current form started on 15 December 2008. The service was named as part of an East Midlands Trains competition to name two new crack express trains.

The northbound service leaves St Pancras at 17:55 for Sheffield.

The service is provided by an InterCity 125 HST train on the southbound service and a 7-car Class 222 Meridian on the northbound service. Both types are fixed-formation diesel sets.

The up (southbound) train in 2010 has an end-to-end journey time of 2 hours 24 minutes. The down (northbound) train takes 2 hours 9 minutes.

Stations served
The South Yorkshireman currently calls at (southbound):
Sheffield
Chesterfield
Derby
Long Eaton
East Midlands Parkway
Loughborough
Leicester
London St Pancras

The South Yorkshireman currently calls at (northbound):
London St Pancras
Leicester
Derby
Chesterfield
Sheffield

Other named trains
East Midlands Railway operates three other named trains called:
Master Cutler
Robin Hood
Sheffield Continental

Notes

See also
East Midlands Trains
InterCity 125
British Rail Class 222
List of named passenger trains of the United Kingdom

External links
East Midlands Trains website
National Rail Enquires website - main web portal for UK train fares, times and other travel information

Named passenger trains of British Rail
Railway services introduced in 1948
Railway services discontinued in 1960
Railway services introduced in 2008